Yellow Wolf or Ho'néoxheóvaestse (died 1864) was a Cheyenne Chief who led the Rope Hair group of the Southern Cheyenne.  He lived to be 85 years old, and died in 1864 at the Sand Creek Massacre at Sand Creek, Colorado, along with his brother. The massacre took place when two militia units, the 1st and 3rd Colorado Regiments, attacked the tribe when they were camping. More than 150 died in the attack; women and children and the elderly were not spared.

Yellow Wolf was held up by George Grinnell, in 1915, as a leader who worked for peace. He said that he was a "constant worker" on behalf of peace. He said it was patriotic work, done out of love for the tribe and its future that he worked in this direction.

Yellow Wolf had a son, Red Moon, who lived through the battle and went on to become another prominent chief.

References

1864 deaths
Year of birth unknown
Native American leaders
Native American people of the Indian Wars